The Uzbekistan cough syrup scandal was a series of poisonings that resulted in the deaths of 18 children in Samarkand and two more children elsewhere in Uzbekistan. It was caused by the drug Dok-1 Max produced by the company Marion Biotech Pvt. Ltd. which operates in India. As a result of laboratory studies, the toxic substance ethylene glycol was found in the composition of the drug. The Indian government opened a case against Marion Biotech, while the Uzbek authorities opened a criminal case against several members of the health system and the employees of the hospital where the children died.

On December 22, the sale and distribution of Dok-1 Max was temporarily suspended, and officially banned in the country on December 29. A doctor who discovered that the syrup contained a poisonous substance was released from his duties. The production process of drugs with this and similar composition at the company's factories was stopped under the influence of the Indian government. In connection with this situation, Uzbekistani president Shavkat Mirziyoyev released Sardor Kariyev, the director of the Agency for the Development of the Pharmaceutical Network under the Ministry of Health. It is claimed that contacts between the World Health Organization and Uzbekistan officials have been established regarding the situation, and the investigation is still ongoing. The customs committee prevented the distribution of about 60,000 boxes of medicines on the day when news of the incident began to spread. In the wake of the event, the Indian government suspended the license of Marion Biotech on January 10, 2023.

Background
Dok-1 Max is a combination drug produced in syrup and tablet form that is intended to combat the symptoms of acute respiratory diseases. As such, it is mainly used in cases of whooping cough, runny nose, wet cough, sore throat, angina, headache, body aches and fever. The instructions of pharmacists indicate that the drug can be used in children aged 2 and over. However, similar formulations in drugs from other companies are mainly recommended for those over 12 years of age. Each 10 ml dose of the drug contains: paracetamol (500 mg), guaifenesin (200 mg), phenylephrine hydrochloride (10 mg), as well as sorbitol propylene glycol, sodium benzoate, citric acid monohydrate, sodium saccharin, sucralose, glycerol, caramel color, ice lemon flavor, menthol and purified water. The color is light brown, and the liquid has a smell and a sweet lemon taste.

The drug was made available in Uzbekistan from 2012 to 2022 and imported under the limited liability company Kuramax Medikal. In the period from September 5 to December 13, 2022, 11 series of dosing devices were certified.

Toxicity

Laboratory studies of Dok-1 Max syrup following the poisonings found ethylene glycol to be the cause of the product's toxicity. Quality control investigations conducted by the Ministry of Health showed that some releases of Dok-1 Max and Ambronol drugs contained ethylene glycol and diethylene glycol instead of propylene glycol (or combined with it). Ethylene glycol is a toxic substance, and a 95% concentrated solution of about 1-2 ml/kg can cause serious health effects, including vomiting, seizures, syncope, acute renal failure, and cardiovascular dysfunction. Concentrations of ethylene glycol and/or diethylene glycol in the cough syrup were found to be 300 times higher than the established standard.

Incidents
An official letter from the head of the Children's Multidisciplinary Medical Center of the Samarkand region, Mamatkul Azizov, to the head of the Health Department of the regional government, Davronbek Jumaniozov, on December 15, describes the tragic circumstances related to Dok-1 Max to have happened "in the last 2 months".

Oltinoy Esanova, the deputy head of the Syrdarya Region health department, reported that the drug had a negative effect on seven children. 3 of the patients are in the intensive care unit, and 4 have recovered. The information advised parents to refer children under 6 years of age who have received Dok-1 Max to family hospitals, even if there are no side effects.

Abduqayum Tokhtaqulov, the head of the health department of Fergana region, reported to the National News Agency that a 3-year-old boy was poisoned. In his message, he noted that the condition of the patient from the city of Kuvasoy was serious and that he was currently being treated on the basis of specially approved standards. Tokhtakulov also told parents that they should keep their children away from such drugs and not to give them to their children.

There were also reports that 9 children were poisoned in Tashkent region. According to the report of the regional administration, until now there had been no cases of death in the region due to the drug. It was reported in the media that 5 of the children in the region recovered, and the condition of 4 was stable.

Akmal Askarov, deputy minister of Karakalpakstan, told the reporter of Karakalpakstan TV channel that 2 children were poisoned by the Dok-1 Max and were sent to the capital for treatment. Spokesman of the Ministry S. Ziyayev noted that the condition of the children was average, with renal toxicity being observed.

Deaths 
Cases of death in young children were recorded in Samarkand (18), Kashkadarya (1) and Namangan (1) regions. 

18 children died in the children's multidisciplinary medical center located in Samarkand after taking cough syrup produced in India. Human rights representative of the Oliy Majlis, ombudsman Aliya Yunusova, representatives of the child rights protection sector and prosecutor's office conducted a special study on children who died in this hospital, showing that all of the dead children were under the age of 6, and 15 of them were children under the age of 3. The patients who died in Samarkand were from Jizzakh, Kashkadarya, Navoi and Samarkand regions.

On December 29, 2022, the number of children who died as a result of taking this drug reached 20. A child born on August 14, 2021 in Dehqonabad district of Kashkadarya region was brought to the Kashkadarya branch of the Emergency Medical Center of the Republic of Uzbekistan on December 27 under the effects of the syrup. The child died on December 28, despite the medical assistance provided.

One of the family members of the deceased child told Daryo.uz about the development of events:

Out of 43 children with acute respiratory diseases, 20 who died shortly after admission were found to have taken excessive amounts of the Dok-1 Max syrup, sometimes consisting of 2.5 to 5 ml 3-4 times a day for 2-7 days.

Responses 
The sale and distribution of imported cough syrup was temporarily suspended on December 22. During a briefing held on December 29, 2022, with the participation of Sevara Ubaidullayeva, the head of the Department of Maternity and Child Protection of the Ministry of Health of Uzbekistan, special recommendations were given to people who took Dok-1 Max, saying that patients who did not develop various symptoms days after taking the drug should not be alarmed. After it was disclosed that several batches of Dok-1 Max and other similar cold syrups were found to contain toxic substances, their sale was banned, but it was reported that some pharmacies were still engaged in selling such drugs. That month, 3 imported batches of the Dok-1 Max (about 60,000 boxes) were placed under strict control by officials of the State Customs Committee against in response to the health crisis.

Ministry of Health

In connection with the incident, officials of the Ministry of Health of Uzbekistan reported that they formed a special working group consisting of qualified specialists of the State Center for Expertise and Standardization of Medicines, Medical Products and Medical Equipment in order to study the negative symptoms caused by the adulterated drug. The message stated that there was a criminal motivation behind the incident, that 7 persons responsible were fired, and that the identified information was sent to the law enforcement authorities. According to the report, the medicine was bought without a doctor's prescription, independently on the recommendation of pharmacists, and was taken in an overdose. Behzod Musayev, the minister of the health department of Republic of Uzbekistan, sent a video message of condolence to the parents and relatives of 18 children who died after taking the Dok-1 Max drug. The head of the Department of Motherhood and Child Protection stated that the result of a study conducted by the special working group appointed by the Ministry showed that the condition observed in children under the influence of syrup had been obtained more than 2 months since its onset; the fact that hospital officials did not provide prompt information on the incident to the ministry on the same day further complicated the situation.

Marion Biotech Pvt. Ltd

World Health Organization (WHO)

Since December 27, WHO has been in contact with government officials in Uzbekistan regarding the deaths of children who died after consuming Dok-1 Max cough syrup:

The total number of deaths from the toxic cough syrup across three countries of the world was 300, as announced by the World Health Organization announced in a press release:

President of Uzbekistan

Sardor Kariyev, who had been working as the director of the Agency for the Development of the Pharmaceutical Network under the Ministry of Health of Uzbekistan since February 2019, was relieved of his duties at a meeting held by the President of the Republic on December 30. The president also learned about the death of children in Samarkand. He criticized officials of the field who were connected to the situation:

Criminal investigation 
Following the scandal, the Indian government has launched an investigation against Marion Biotech. The company, who manufactured the Dok-1 Max drug, was registered as a small producer in India in 2010 and as an international exporter in 2016. Kuramax Medikal LLC, which imported the company's products to Uzbekistan, was registered in Uzbekistan in 2006, headed by Singh Ragvendra Pratar. The Narcotics Licensing and Control Authority of Uttar Pradesh has been entrusted with the investigation. On December 29, 2022, Marion Biotech officially stopped the production of its Dok-1 Max cough syrup, which had caused the death of more than 20 children in Uzbekistan. According to the Economic Times, the investigative commission asked the government of Uzbekistan for a report on children who died as a result of drug.

In connection with this incident, the Investigation Department of the State Security Service of Uzbekistan initiated a criminal case against the officials of Kuramax Medikal and Scientific Center for Standardization of Medicines under Article 186-3, Part 4, Clause "a" of the Criminal Code.  Suspects were arrested. Among the 7 officials released from their positions is Mamatqul Azizov, who discovered that the syrup was dangerous and that it was this drug that caused the death of children. News began to spread that these officials may be reinstated.  Kun.uz website reports that the newly appointed Minister of Health Amrillo Inoyatov held a meeting with 7 dismissed officials.

The Dok-1 Max drug exported from India to Uzbekistan was subjected to laboratory tests by Scientific Center for Standardization of Medicines LLC. However, the review was not systematic, meaning that the drugs were not thoroughly tested. State security authorities arrested two heads of Kuramax Medikal LLC and Scientific Center for Standardization of Medicines as suspects in connection with this case.

On the night of December 30, 2022, a special task force formed by the Indian government with the participation of the Drug Standards Control Center and the Uttar Pradesh Drug Control Department completed the inspection of the Marion Biotech pharmaceutical factory. As a result of the investigation, government officials demanded the end of production, and the company's manufacturing plants in Noida, as well as the production of Nolgripp, Sinepar, Dok-1 Max, Travamax and other similar drugs, were suspended.

On January 2, 2023, the sale of all drugs imported by Kuramax Medikal that were found to contain ethylene glycol and diethylene glycol was stopped.  On January 10, the Indian government suspended the license of Marion Biotech, the manufacturer of Dok-1 Max. On January 13, the license of Kuramax Medikal LLC was revoked by a decision of the Tashkent Interdistrict Economic Court.

See also 
Toxic cough syrup

Notes

References

External links 
 Central Asia's Dangerous Pharmaceutical Industry

Health disasters in Uzbekistan 
2022 health disasters
2022 in Uzbekistan
Adulteration
Mass poisoning
Medical scandals